Yelena Koshcheyeva (born 17 February 1973 in Taraz, Zhambyl Province) is a Kazakhstani long jumper.

Her most successful year was 2002, when she won a bronze medal at the Asian Games and a gold medal at the Asian Championships in Colombo. In 2004, she reached the long jump final at the Olympic Games, finishing eleventh. She also competed at the World Championships in 1999, 2001 and 2003 without ever reaching the final.

Her personal best is 6.76 metres, achieved in May 1998 in Bishkek.

Competition record

References

External links
 

1973 births
Living people
People from Taraz
Kazakhstani female long jumpers
Athletes (track and field) at the 1996 Summer Olympics
Athletes (track and field) at the 2000 Summer Olympics
Athletes (track and field) at the 2004 Summer Olympics
Olympic athletes of Kazakhstan
Asian Games medalists in athletics (track and field)
Athletes (track and field) at the 1998 Asian Games
Athletes (track and field) at the 2002 Asian Games
Asian Games bronze medalists for Kazakhstan
Medalists at the 2002 Asian Games
Kazakhstani people of Russian descent